Del Toro (Of the Bull in English) is a surname first found in the Castilian province of Zamora in Spain, dating back to the sixteenth century. It is also found in sixty-five communes throughout Italy with a predominant presence in the provinces of Teramo (Abruzzo) and Siena (Tuscany).

Angelo Del Toro (1947–1994), New York politician
Arancha del Toro, also known as Arancha Solis (born 1973), Spanish film, television, and theater actress
Benicio del Toro (born 1967), Puerto Rican actor
Carlos Del Toro (born 1961), Cuban-born American businessman and U.S. Secretary of the Navy nominee
Carlos del Toro Orihuela (born 1954), Cuban artist 
David del Toro Jiménez (born 1997), known as David Toro, Spanish footballer
Emiliano Mercado del Toro (1891-2007), for a while the oldest person in the world
Emilio del Toro Cuebas (1876-1955), Chief Justice of the Supreme Court of Puerto Rico from 1909 to 1922
Enrique Campos del Toro (1900–c.1970), Puerto Rican banker and law professor
Guillermo del Toro (born 1964), Mexican film director
Herminio Brau del Toro (born 1922), Puerto Rican lawyer, engineer, professor, writer and industrialist
Josefina del Toro Fulladosa (1901–1975), the first woman to become a library school professor in Puerto Rico 
Mario Enrique del Toro (born 1966), Mexican politician 
Miguel del Toro (1972–2001), Mexican baseball pitcher
Miguel Carlos Francisco Alvarez del Toro (1917–1996), Mexican biologist 
Rebeca Pous Del Toro (born 1978), Spanish singer
Salvador Barajas del Toro (born 1972), Mexican politician 
Tomás del Toro del Villar (born 1959), Mexican politician
Ulises Rosales del Toro (born 1942), Cuban general and Minister of Agriculture
Uriel del Toro (born 1978), Mexican actor and model

Notes

Spanish-language surnames